Friedrich Georg von Sohr (1775–1845) was a Prussian general who as a colonel of Prussian hussars commanded the 2nd cavalry brigade at Waterloo and during the Battle of Rocquencourt.

Biography 
His brigade consisted of the 3rd Brandenburg and 5th Pommeranian Hussar and the 11th (2nd Westphalian) Hussars Cavalry Regiment and were part of Major General von Wahlen-Jürgass' cavalry in Lieutenant General von Pirch's II Corps. Von Sohr was severely wounded while trapped in Le Chesnay, and surrendered to the French forces of General Jean Baptiste Alexandre Strolz.

References

Further reading 
 

Prussian commanders of the Napoleonic Wars
19th-century German people
Military personnel from Berlin
Recipients of the Pour le Mérite (military class)
Cavalry commanders
Lieutenant generals of Prussia